The Warning is the first studio album by American progressive metal band Queensrÿche, released on September 7, 1984, and reissued on May 6, 2003, with three bonus tracks.

In 2019, Metal Hammer ranked it as the 13th best power metal album of all time.

Background
Queensrÿche wrote the material for The Warning during their tour in support of the Queensrÿche EP, inspired by world events and the 1949 George Orwell novel Nineteen Eighty-Four. The album was recorded in various recording studios in London with Pink Floyd-producer James Guthrie.

In 2013, lead singer Geoff Tate explained the band's dissatisfaction with the album's mix: "The only time I ever experienced [a record label restricting creative freedom] was during the recording of Queensrÿche's first album, The Warning. We went $300,000 over budget and the label took the record out of our hands and gave it to someone else to mix. ... The guy that mixed the album had no clue what Queensrÿche was. He never listened to hard rock music and didn't take input from anyone in the band. He just mixed it according to how he thought it should sound. No-one in the band could listen to that record. We all hated it."

The Warning shows the band in an early stage of development, playing straight heavy metal songs unlike later albums in which more experimentation was expressed. It was a moderate commercial success in the United States, although none of the singles charted domestically. However, "Take Hold of the Flame" was an international hit, particularly in Japan.

In support of the release, Queensrÿche went on a worldwide tour from August 1984 through to July 1985. During the American leg of their tour, they were the opening act for Kiss on their 1984–85 Animalize Tour and Iron Maiden on their 1984–85 World Slavery Tour, while in Europe they opened for Dio on their The Last in Line tour 1984. They also opened for Accept on their Metal Heart tour in 1985.

Track listing

The album's original track sequence and sound mix that the band had approved, was changed by mix engineer Val Garay under orders from EMI-America, against the wishes of the band. This original intended sequence is identical to the final track listing but with the following exceptions: "N M 156" as the opening song, "Warning" as the second to last track, and "Deliverance" and "No Sanctuary" appearing in the opposite order. The band first learned of this in August 1984, while on tour in Japan.

Original track listing (unreleased)
N M 156
En Force
No Sanctuary
Deliverance
Take Hold of the Flame
Before the Storm
Child of Fire
Warning
Roads to Madness

Personnel

Queensrÿche
Geoff Tate – lead vocals
Chris DeGarmo – guitar (lead guitar on "Take Hold of the Flame"), background vocals
Michael Wilton – guitar (lead guitar on "Warning"), background vocals
Eddie Jackson – bass, background vocals
Scott Rockenfield – drums

Additional musicians
Michael Kamen – conducting, orchestral arrangement

Production
James Guthrie – production
Val Garay – mixing
Neil Kernon – engineering, mixing ("The Prophecy"), production

Charts

Certifications

References

Queensrÿche albums
1984 albums
EMI America Records albums
Albums produced by James Guthrie (record producer)